Dalderby is a surname. Notable people with the surname include:

John Dalderby (died 1320), medieval Bishop of Lincoln
John Dalderby (MP) ( 1413), English politician
William Dalderby ( 1383–1404), English politician

English-language surnames